Irie Hill (born 16 January 1969) is an English female athlete who competes in the pole vault event. She has a personal best performance of 4.20 metres.

Hill was born in Germany but moved to England in 1996 and became a British citizen in 1999. She only began vaulting relatively late in life at the age of 26.

Athletics career
Hill competed for England at the 2002 Commonwealth Games in Manchester, England winning a bronze medal. She also won the British title in the same year.

Hill has also gone on to win numerous World and European Masters titles including achieving a world W50 record in the pole vault of 3.51m while winning the 2019 World Masters Indoor Athletics Championships in Torun, Poland. This is in addition to the world W45 pole vault record of 3.76m set by Hill on 3 July 2015 in Regensburg, Germany.

References

1969 births
Living people
English female pole vaulters
Athletes (track and field) at the 2002 Commonwealth Games
Commonwealth Games medallists in athletics
Commonwealth Games bronze medallists for England
Medallists at the 2002 Commonwealth Games